The 1984 Budweiser Trans-Am Championship was the nineteenth running of the Sports Car Club of America's premier series.

Results

Championship standings (Top 10)

References

Trans-Am Series
Trans-Am